Amenemḥat  or Amenemhēt , hellenized as Ammenémēs  (Eusebius: Ἀμμενέμης) or as Ammanémēs  (Africanus: Ἀμμανέμης), is an Ancient Egyptian name meaning "Amun is in front". Amenemhat was the name of a number of kings, princes and administration officials throughout ancient Egyptian history.

Kings
Amenemhat I (or Amenemhet I) (reigned c. 1991 BC – c. 1962 BC), the first ruler of the 12th dynasty
Amenemhat II (or Amenemhet II) (reigned c. 1929 BC – c. 1895 BC), the third pharaoh of the 12th dynasty
Amenemhat III (or Amenemhet III) (reigned c. 1860 BC – c. 1814 BC), pharaoh during the 12th dynasty
Amenemhat IV (or Amenemhet IV) (reigned c. 1815 BC – c. 1806 BC), the penultimate pharaoh of the 12th dynasty
Amenemhat Senbef (or Sonbef) (reigned c. 1800 BC – c. 1796 BC), the second king of the 13th dynasty
Sekhemkare Amenemhat (or Amenemhat V) (fl. early 18th century BC),  Egyptian king during the 13th dynasty
Amenemhat VI Ameny Antef (fl. mid-18th century BC), Egyptian king during the 13th dynasty
Sedjefakare Kay Amenemhat (or Amenemhat VII) (fl. mid-18th century BC), Egyptian king during the 13th dynasty

Princes
Amenemhatankh (fl. early 19th century BC), prince of the 12th dynasty and a son of Amenemhat II
Amenemhat (son of Thutmose III) (fl. mid-15th century BC), prince of the 18th dynasty of Egypt and a son of Pharaoh Thutmose III
Amenemhat (son of Thutmose IV) (fl. early 14th century BC), prince during the 18th dynasty of Egypt and the son of Pharaoh Thutmose IV

Officials
Amenemhat (nomarch, 16th nome) (fl. mid-20th century BC), nomarch of the 16th nome during the 12th dynasty
Amenemhat (High Priest of Amun) (fl. late 15th century BC), High Priest of Amun during the reign of Amenhotep II
Amenemhat (chief of Teh-khet), chief of Teh-khet, Nubian local governor in office under Hatshepsut and Thutmoses III

Other
 Amen-em-hat, a wealthy man living near Luxor ca. 320 BCE, who commissioned the Book of the Dead of Amen-em-hat
 5010 Amenemhêt, main-belt asteroid

References 

Ancient Egyptian given names
Theophoric names